Bent Blach Petersen (28 September 1924 – 1 January 1984) was a Danish rower. He competed at the 1952 Summer Olympics in Helsinki with the men's coxed four where they were eliminated in the semi-final repêchage.

References

1924 births
1984 deaths
Danish male rowers
Olympic rowers of Denmark
Rowers at the 1952 Summer Olympics
Sportspeople from Aarhus
European Rowing Championships medalists